Alejandro Osorio may refer to:
 Alejandro Osorio (footballer)
 Alejandro Osorio (cyclist)